F8, F.VIII, F 8, F-8, or F/8 may refer to:

Aviation 
F 8 Barkarby, a former Swedish Air Force wing
F-8 Crusader, a 1955 American single-engine carrier-based jet fighter aircraft built by Vought
F-8 Mosquito, the designation for the de Havilland Mosquito in USAAF aerial reconnaissance service
F8C Falcon, a 1928 American single-engine carrier-based biplane fighter aircraft built by Curtiss
F8F Bearcat, a 1944 American single-engine carrier-based fighter aircraft built by Grumman
Fokker F.VIII, a 1927 Dutch large twin-engine airliner
Freedom Airlines, IATA airline designator
Kampfgeschwader 40, from its historic Geschwaderkennung code with the Luftwaffe in World War II
Shenyang F-8, an export version of the Chinese Shenyang J-8 jet interceptor aircraft

Biology 
Coagulation factor VIII
 F8: an EEG electrode site according to the 10-20 system.

Media 
 Frequency-8, a record label for electronic music producers Mars & Mystre
 Festival 8, the 8th three-day festival by the rock band Phish, held October 30 – November 1, 2009 in Indio, CA
 The Fate of the Furious (Fast & Furious 8) aka "F8" (2017 film)
 8, a common aperture in photography as exemplified by the photojournalism saying "8 and be there"
 F8, the 8th studio album by American heavy metal band Five Finger Death Punch

Technology 
Fairchild F8, a 1977 8-bit microprocessor
f8, a block cipher used in the context of third generation mobile communications systems
Function key, on a computer keyboard
Facebook F8, an annual conference hosted by Facebook

Vehicles 
DKW F8, compact front-wheel drive two-stroke engined saloon, introduced in 1939.
Ferrari F8, a mid-engined sports car produced by the Italian automobile manufacturer Ferrari
LNER Class F8, a class of British steam locomotives

Other 
 F8 (classification), a standing wheelchair disability sport classification
 F8, Sydney Ferries' Cockatoo Island Ferry Services

See also
 Fate (disambiguation), "fate" sometimes slang spelled as "f8"